The China women's national football team (China PR) has represented China (People's Republic of China) at the FIFA Women's World Cup on eight occasions in 1991, 1995, 1999,  2003, 2007, 2015, 2019 and 2023, finishing as runners up once (1999) and once in fourth place (1995).

1991 World Cup 

Since the World Cup that year took place in the People's Republic of China, the Chinese did not have to qualify. Nevertheless, the team participated in the 1991 AFC Women's Championship, which served as qualification for the other Asian teams. The PRC won the championship with five wins.

At the group stages China PR was placed with Norway, Denmark and New Zealand. On 16 November 1991, the China PR and Norway competed in Guangzhou for the first official women's World Cup match. Ma Li scored the first goal in the 22nd minute. In the second half, the Chinese then scored three more goals and won with a score of 4-0. In the second game against Denmark they drew 2-2, but were able to win the last game against New Zealand by 4-1 and were group winners. In the quarter-finals they met Sweden. In the 3rd minute of the game Pia Sundhage scored for the Scandinavians, and the score remained 0-1 until the end. The Chinese were eliminated.

Group A

Quarter-finals

1995 World Cup 

China PR participated in the Qualification Asian Games 1994 in Hiroshima, in a group of four also consisting of Japan, Republic of China (Taiwan), and South Korea. After a 1-1 draw against Japan, both won against the other two teams and then met again in the final, when the Chinese won 2-0. Both finalists went to the World Cup, which took place for the first time on European soil.

At the World Cup in Sweden China PR was in the same group as defending champions United States, Australia and Denmark. They started the group matches with a 3-3 draw against the USA, followed by a 4-2 victory against Australia and 3-1 against Denmark. With equal points to the USA, they were group second due to worse goal difference. In the quarter-finals they met the hosts Sweden. The Chinese went on top in the 29th minute, keeping the 1-0 lead until the 90th minute. In the third minute of added time, Ulrika Kalte equalized for the Swedes. Since no team could score a goal in the subsequent extra time, there was the first penalty shootout at a women's World Cup. Here the Chinesecame through a 4-3, reaching the semi-finals for the first time. China PR then lost in the semi-finals against Germany, with Bettina Wiegmann scoring in the 88th. The also lost the match for the third place against the USA with a score of 0-2. With the fourth place, however, the Chinese qualified for the first women's football tournament at the Olympic Games 1996, in which only the eight best teams of the World Cup participated.

Group C

Quarter-finals

Semi-finals

Third place play-off

1999 World Cup

For the third World Cup, the Chinese qualified as winners of the 1997 AFC Women's Championship. After three victories against North Korea, Uzbekistan and the Philippines, they heavily defeated the Republic of China (Taiwan) with a score of 10-0, securing their ticket to the USA World Cup. In the final they defeated North Korea again.

In the USA they won the opening game against Sweden by 2-1, followed by a 7-0 win against Ghana, and a 3-1 victory against Australia. In the quarter-finals they won 2-0 against Russia. In the semifinals China PR defeated the defending champions Norway, by 5-0, the highest score against a defending champion at a World Cup. In the final in front of the record crowd of 90,185 spectators, they met the host USA. After scoreless 120 minutes, the champion was decided penalty shootout, for the first time in the Women's World Cup. While all five US players scored, Liu Ying missed against Briana Scurry. This runner-up result has been their best to date. Sun Wen and the Brazilian Sissi became top scorers with seven goals each. Sun Wen was also awarded the Golden Ball for Best Player of the Tournament. In addition, the China PR received the fair play award.

Group D

Quarter-finals

Semi-finals

Final

2003 World Cup

The 2003 World Cup was scheduled to take place again in China, but due to the SARS epidemic it was relocated to the United States. The Chinese women had to compete in the Asia Cup in order to gain qualification. In the group stage, the Chinese defeated Vietnam (6-0), India (12-0), and Uzbekistan (11-0). In the semi-final they won 3-1 against South Korea, and then lost the final 1-2 by Golden Goal against North Korea.

In the USA World Cup group stages, China PR won 1-0 against Ghana, drew 1-1 against Australia, and won 1-0 win against Russia. They were eliminated in the quarter-finals with a 0-1 defeat against Canada.

Group D

Quarter-finals

2007 Women's Cup

Four years later, the World Cup took place for the second time in the People's Republic of China. As hosts, the Chinese team did not have to qualify, but they still participated in the Asian Championship 2006 which served as the Qualification for the other teams of the AFC. China PR was able to win the Asian Champion title for the eighth time, after two consecutive successes by North Korea.

For the first time, the Chinese team had a foreign coach, the Swede Marika Domanski Lyfors, who had coached Sweden at the 1999 and 2003 World Cups. At the World Cup group stages, China PR defeated Denmark by 3-2, lost against Brazil by 0-4, the highest score defeat of a host of a women's World Cup, but with a 2-0 win against New Zealand still reached quarter-finals as group second. They were eliminated at this stage with a 0-1 loss against Norway.

Group D

Quarter-finals

2011 World Cup

For the 2011 World Cup in Germany, the China PR failed to qualify for the first time. At the 2010 Asian Cup held in the China, they could not benefit from the home advantage and finished in fourth place. Although they won against Vietnam (5-0) and Australia (1-0), after a goalless start against South Korea, they lost to North Korea 0-1 and then lost 0-2 against Japan in the match for third place.

2015 World Cup

In the Qualification for the World Cup in Canada, for which the Asian women were given five starting positions after the increase in the number of participants, China PR took part in the 2014 Asia Cup. After a 7-0 win against Thailand at the start of the group stage, they won 3-0 over Myanmar, and drew 0-0 with South Korea. The semi-final was lost against reigning world champions Japan with a score of 1-2, but China PR won the match for third place with a score of 2-1 against South Korea. Australia qualified second, South Korea fourth and Thailand fifth.

In the draw, the People's Republic of China was assigned to Group A along with host Canada, against whom the opening match was played. China lost the opening Match to Canada 1-0, with the only goal scored by a penalty in stoppage time. In the second group match against the Netherlands, they won 1-0 stoppage time. With a 2-2 draw in the last group match against New Zealand, they reached the second round as group second. In the round of 16, they defeated Cameroon, which was participating for the first time, by 1-0. In the quarter-finals they played against the United States, for the first time since 1999. As in 1999, the game went without goals in the first half, but six minutes after the restart, Carli Lloyd scored for a USA 1-0 victory. The Chinese were eliminated for the fourth time in the quarterfinals. With the quarterfinals also ended the term of coach Hao Wei. In September, the former French coach Bruno Bini was hired as successor.

Group A

Round of 16

Quarter-finals

2019 World Cup

In the Qualification for the World Cup in France, for which the Asian women were again given five starting positions, the China PR qualified by reaching the semi-finals of the Asian Championship 2018, which took place in April 2018 in Jordan. With three wins against Thailand, the Philippines and hosts Jordan, China PR reached the semi-finals, where they lost against Japan. They then won the game for third place against Thailand.

At the World Cup in France, the China PR met in the group stage with Germany, Spain and World Cup newcomer South Africa. In the game against Germany, the German playmaker Dzsenifer Marozsán suffered a toe break and dropped out for the rest of the group matches. Giulia Gwinn scored the only goal of the game in the second half, giving Germany a 1-0 win. The Chinese team then won 1-0 against South Africa with a goal from Li Ying. For the final game of the group stages against Spain, both teams only needed a draw to qualify. Both teams adopted a low-risk strategy and after a scoreless 90 minutes they reached knockout stages. In the round of 16, the Chinese 0-2 against Italy.

Group B

Round of 16

2023 World Cup

Group D

Overall record

Goalscorers

Notes

References

 
World Cup
Countries at the FIFA Women's World Cup